The Honourable William Ralph Talbot Chetwynd  (July 28, 1890 – April 3, 1957) was a British-Canadian businessman and politician. The town of Chetwynd, British Columbia was named in his honor.

Born in Staffordshire, England, he was the younger brother of Sir (Arthur Henry) Talbot Chetwynd, 7th Baronet. He came to Canada at the age of eighteen, and was soon in Ashcroft, British Columbia (west of Kamloops Lake). He received employment from Charles Paget, 6th Marquess of Anglesey (nephew of Lady Florence Cecilia Paget, who was married to Chetwynd's first cousin once removed Sir George, 4th Baronet) to manage Anglesey's fruit farm holdings at Walhachin.

On October 8, 1912, he married Frances Mary Jupe, daughter of James Jupe of Mere, Wiltshire.

He fought in World War I as a member of the Royal Field Artillery, attaining the rank of lieutenant therein. He received the Military Cross in 1918 for his service.

After returning from Europe, he entered cattle ranching and the transportation business needed to get the cattle and other agriculture products to eastern markets. As a fruit grower and rancher, he saw both the potential for the Cariboo and Peace River Country, but also the need for efficient rail transportation to serve the region.

In 1942 he became the public relations officer for Pacific Great Eastern Railway (PGE; later BC Rail; now part of the CN Rail system), a post he held until 1952; he also served as a director of the PGE. He was a big advocate for building a railroad to central British Columbia. Running as a member from the District of Cariboo, he was elected to provincial legislature in 1952. He served on the Executive Council of British Columbia as Minister of Trade and Industry, Railways and Fisheries from 1952 to 1956, and also as Minister of Agriculture. At the age of 66, ill health forced him to retire from politics.

Full of confidence, he once bet executives at PGE, and politicians (a new Stetson hat), that the new extension line for Peace River would leave North Vancouver on June 11, 1956 at 4:15 pm. He had many takers, totaling more than $800 in hats. He won the bet, and got his picture in the newspaper wearing a stack of hats.

Chetwynd died at Victoria, British Columbia on April 3, 1957.

Rail service arrived in Little Prairie in April 1958. It would bring an economic transformation to the area, which until then had to rely on trucks to get any goods, such as timber, out of the valley.

The Premier of British Columbia, W.A.C. Bennett, renamed the PGE station at Little Prairie to Chetwynd, in his honor, and the town of Little Prairie soon changed its name in 1959.

Notes

1890 births
1957 deaths
British Army personnel of World War I
British Columbia Social Credit Party MLAs
Canadian transportation businesspeople
Canadian cattlemen
Canadian orchardists
Canadian public relations people
Canadian recipients of the Military Cross
English emigrants to Canada
Farmers from British Columbia
Members of the Executive Council of British Columbia
People from Staffordshire
People from the Thompson-Nicola Regional District
Royal Field Artillery officers
20th-century Canadian legislators